The FIFA Youth Tournament Under-18 1954 Final Tournament was held in West Germany. It was the last time the FIFA was organiser, from next year on, the UEFA would take over.

Teams
The following teams entered the tournament:

  (invited)
 
 
 
 
 
  (host)

Group stage

Group 1

Group 2

Group 3

Group 4

Semifinals

Places 13-16

Places 9-12

Places 5-8

Places 1-4

Final Matches

Seventeenth Place Match

Fifteenth Place Match

Thirteenth Place Match

Eleventh Place Match

Ninth Place Match

Seventh-place match

Fifth-place match

Third place match

Final

External links
Results by RSSSF

UEFA European Under-19 Championship
1954
Under-18
Under-18
Under
April 1954 sports events in Europe
1954 in West German sport
1954 in youth association football